Events from the year 1159 in Ireland.

Incumbents
 High King: Muirchertach Mac Lochlainn

Deaths
 Aed mac Donnchada (Gilla na Findmona), King of Uí Failghe

References

 
1150s in Ireland
Ireland
Years of the 12th century in Ireland